is a Japanese novel series written by Tatsuya Hamazaki and illustrated by Shingo Araki and is a spin-off of Masami Kurumada's manga series Saint Seiya. The series was released by Shueisha under their Jump J-Books light novel imprint. The first novel was released in Japan on August 23, 2002, while the second was released on December 16, 2002.

Plot 
In the early days of mythology, the goddess Athena, with the support of her Saints, waged countless wars to protect love and justice in the world, and in one of these battles they faced fearsome adversaries known as Gigas, who followed to the god Typhon.  At the end of that terrible war, Typhon and the Gigas were finally defeated and sealed under Mount Etna in Sicily.

The Giants have returned with a single goal, to spread blood and death, making it known to their ancient enemy, Athena. These ancient beings wear a solid cloth called Adamas (which is usually as solid and hard as diamond itself) and to achieve their plans they first need to resurrect Typhon, their king.

The Sicily Island is a place where one of the hundred sons of Mitsumasa Kido was sent to train years ago, destined like his stepbrothers to become a Saint. A young man was called Mei, who stayed longer than expected in his training place, and the cloth of Coma that he's wearing doesn't belong to any of the ranks of Athena's army (bronze, silver or gold).

Volume list

Characters

Athena Army
 Saori Kido (Athena)

Bronze Saints
 
 
 
 
 
 Sextans Yulij (六分儀座（セクスタンス）のユーリ, sekusutansu no yūri)

Silver Saints
 Altar Nicole (祭壇座（アルター）のニコル, arutā no nikoru)

Other
 Coma Mei (髪の毛座の盟, kōma no mei)

Gigas Army
 Typhon (テュポーン, tyupōn)
 Agrios (蛮力のアグリオス, banriki no aguriosu)
 Enkelados (エンケラドス, enkeradosu)
 Pallas (魯鈍のパラス, rodon no parasu)
 Thoas (迅雷のトアス, jinrai no toasu)

Other
 Chimera (キマイラ, chimaira)
 Orthrus (オルトロス, orutorosu)
 Ladon (ラードーン, rādōn)

References

2002 Japanese novels
Jump J-Books
Gigantomachia
Shueisha books